Fernand Brosius (15 May 1934 – 14 January 2014) was a Luxembourg association football player.

International career
He was a member of the Luxembourg national football team from 1956 to 1965. He was member of the squad who reached the quarter finals of the 1964 UEFA Championship.

References

External links

Luxembourgian footballers
Luxembourg international footballers
CA Spora Luxembourg players
People from Differdange
1934 births
2014 deaths
Association football defenders